Paris Métro Line 9 is one of 16 lines of the Paris Métro. The line links Pont de Sèvres in Boulogne in the west with Mairie de Montreuil in the east via the city center of Paris, creating a parabola type shape to its route. It is the third busiest line on the network.

Line 9 interchanges with all of the 13 other main Métro lines, except for one (Line 12), not including 3bis and 7bis according to the RATP maps. There is, however, a connection to Line 12 via the underground passageway from Saint-Augustin to Saint-Lazare.

History

Chronology
8 November 1922: The first section of line 9 was opened between Exelmans and Trocadéro in the 16th arrondissement.
27 May 1923: The line was extended from Trocadéro to Saint Augustin.
3 June 1923: The line was extended from Saint Augustin to Chaussée d'Antin.
29 September 1923: The line was extended southbound from Exelmans to Porte de St-Cloud.
30 June 1928: The line was extended from Chaussée d'Antin to Richelieu-Drouot.
10 December 1933: The line was extended from Richelieu-Drouot to Porte de Montreuil.
3 February 1934: The line was extended from Porte de St-Cloud to Pont de Sèvres.
14 October 1937: The line was extended from Porte de Montreuil to Mairie de Montreuil.
2 September 1939: At the outbreak of World War II, service to Saint-Martin ceased. Unlike most other stations, however, Saint-Martin never re-opened due to its proximity to Strasbourg - Saint-Denis (only 100 meters separate the two stations).
21 October 2013: Gradual cascading of MF 67 to MF 01 trains began.

Origins
Line 9 was originally envisioned as a branch of Line 2 Sud (now known as Line 6) between Porte de Saint-Cloud and Trocadero. However, it was concluded by the CMP to combine this segment with a proposed segment that was to be built towards Opera, and thus Line 9 is created. The first section between Trocadero and Exelmans opened on 8 November 1922.

Construction and Extensions
Construction of the original sections (as well as the extension towards République) proved to be difficult due to public opposition in the various arrondissements as well as unstable soil above the tunnels. Public support for the line's construction was greatly difficult due in part to proposed sections that various entities saw as impossible to build and operate under government regulations at the time. In addition, unstable soil led to the collapse of several sections of tunnel being constructed. The double-decker tunnel, which is located between stations Richelieu - Drouot and République (and carries Line 9 on the lower level, while Line 8 is situated on the upper level) was especially problematic due to unstable ground at Grand Boulevards. As a result, this particular section had to be reinforced by central piers.

The first extension into the suburbs, towards Pont de Sèvres, opened on 3 February 1934. On 14 October 1937, the eastern extension towards Mairie de Montreuil opened. Since then, few changes to the line's infrastructure have been made. (from :fr:Ligne 9 du métro de Paris)

Rolling stock

Line 9 is operated with the MF 01 stock in five-car sets. Before that, line 9 was the last line equipped of the pre-war Sprague-Thomson-trains, which were removed from service on 16 April 1983. On 9 February 2011, the STIF announced plans to acquire 66 new Mf 01-trainsets. The €330 million order began deliveries during June 2013 and will continue through 2016 to replace the current stock on line 9. The Last MF67 on Line 9 was withdrawn from service on 28 November 2016. On 21 October 2013, the first MF 01 railcar (#096) entered revenue service along Line 9, after spending the course of June through September running along Line 5. The Auteuil workshops, which Line 10 used to share with Line 9, was not equipped to handle maintenance operations for the MF 01 rolling stock, and thus heavy maintenance work was done at the Bobigny workshops along Line 5.

Renamed stations
6 October 1942: Rond-Point des Champs-Elysées renamed Marbeuf – Rond-Point des Champs-Elysées.
30 October 1946: Marbeuf – Rond-Point des Champs-Elysées renamed Franklin D. Roosevelt.
1989: Chaussée d'Antin renamed Chaussée d'Antin – La Fayette.
September 1998: Rue Montmartre renamed Grands Boulevards and Rue des Boulets – Rue de Montreuil renamed Rue des Boulets.

Route

Future
A two-station extension to Montreuil - Hôpital is planned for the future. The new stations will connect line 9 with tramway 1 and future metro line 11.

Tourism
Metro line 9 passes near several places of interest :
Parc des Princes football stadium (Home of Paris Saint-Germain football team).
The place du Trocadéro offering a view of the Eiffel Tower.
The avenue des Champs-Élysées.
Place Saint-Augustin.
Place de la République.
Place de la Nation.

See also

References

External links

  RATP official website
  RATP english speaking website
  Interactive Map of the RER (from RATP's website)
  Interactive Map of the Paris métro (from RATP's website)
  Metro-Pole website, dedicated to Paris public transports (unofficial)

 
Railway lines opened in 1922